Non is the third photobook by Japanese model Nozomi Sasaki, released in late 2009 by Shueisha.

As Nozomi Sasaki's first self-produced photobook, it consists of photographs of her, several of her columns, and several interviews with her. It also contains her private photos and semi-nude photos.

Soon after the release, on November 29, 2009, a commemorative event was held in Ginza, Tokyo.

References

2009 non-fiction books
Photographic collections and books